The Baton Rouge Open was a golf tournament on the Ben Hogan Tour. It was played only in 1990, at The Country Club of Louisiana in Baton Rouge, Louisiana.

Winners

Bolded golfers graduated to the PGA Tour via the final Ben Hogan Tour money list.

References

Former Korn Ferry Tour events
Golf in Louisiana
Sports competitions in Baton Rouge, Louisiana
1990 establishments in Louisiana
1990 disestablishments in Louisiana